The New York Aurora was a 19th-century daily newspaper in New York City.

History
Founded in 1841, the newspaper claimed to be politically independent but also "democratic, in the strongest sense of the word". The four-page, two-penny daily newspaper was owned by Anson Herrick and John F. Ropes and had a circulation of about 5,000. Its first editor was Thomas Low Nichols, who left by February 1842 after printing a libelous article.

Walt Whitman began contributing to the Aurora in February 1842; his first works in the publication are likely the series "Walks in Broadway". He was named the paper's editor on March 28, 1842. In his editorials, Whitman was open in expressing his personal opinions and beliefs and wrote about New York attractions and personalities, local theater and opera, and various happenings around the city. The Brooklyn Eagle praised the new editor as offering "marked change for the better" but noted "a dash of egotism" in him. In fact, owners Anson and Herrick accused Whitman of writing biased articles, including some that criticized Bishop John Hughes as "serpent tongued" and a "hypocritical scoundrel". Their quarrels led to Whitman leaving the Aurora in May 1842.

References

External links
"Whitman's Editorial Work on the New York Aurora" from the Walt Whitman Archive

Defunct newspapers published in New York City
Daily newspapers published in New York City